Curaçao requires its residents to register their motor vehicles and display vehicle registration plates.

Current plates are North American standard 6 × 12 inches (152 × 300 mm). 

Curaçao is expected to implement car plates with the FE-Schrift font in the near future.

Prefixes

References

Weblinks 
Curaçao license plates pictures at Francoplaque

Curaçao
Transport in Curaçao
Curaçao-related lists